Jorge "Jordi" Mendoza Parrado (born 15 June 1972 in Barcelona) is a B1 goalball player and track and field athlete from Spain. He played goalball at the 1996 Summer Paralympics. His team was third. He was as the 2000 Summer Paralympics in Sydney, Australia.  He threw the discus and javelin.

References

External links 
  (1996)
  (1992, 2000)
 

1972 births
Living people
Paralympic goalball players of Spain
Paralympic bronze medalists for Spain
Paralympic medalists in goalball
Goalball players at the 1996 Summer Paralympics
Athletes (track and field) at the 2000 Summer Paralympics
Medalists at the 1996 Summer Paralympics
Athletes from Barcelona
Spanish male javelin throwers
Spanish male discus throwers
Visually impaired javelin throwers
Visually impaired discus throwers
Paralympic javelin throwers
Paralympic discus throwers